Vema bacescui is a species of monoplacophoran, a superficially limpet-like marine mollusc.

It is found in the Peru-Chile Trench of the southeastern Pacific Ocean. At 2.8 cm, it is relatively large for a monoplacophoran.

References

Monoplacophora
Molluscs described in 1968